Oleksander Horilyj (Ukrainian: Олександр Горілий), (14.09.1863, Chernigov Governorate  - after 1937)  was a Ukrainian conductor. Graduated from Moscow conservatoire and medical institute. In 1918 he became the first conductor of the Ukrainian National Symphony Orchestra
. Subjected to repression in 1937.

Notes

Further reading
Муха Антон. Композитори України та української діаспори. — К.: 2004. — 
Козловский А. О некоторых грустных традициях и коррективах исполнения// Муз. академия, 1993, №2.

Year of birth missing
Year of death missing
Place of birth missing
Ukrainian conductors (music)